Streptomyces chumphonensis is a bacterium species from the genus of Streptomyces which has been isolated from marine sediments from the Chumphon province in Thailand.

See also 
 List of Streptomyces species

References

Further reading 
 

chumphonensis
Bacteria described in 2014